Richard Backwell (born 28 December 1963) is an Australian professional golfer.

Backwell played on the Japan Golf Tour from 1994 to 2002, winning once.

Professional wins (3)

Japan Golf Tour wins (1)

Japan Golf Tour playoff record (1–0)

Canadian Tour wins (1)

Japan Challenge Tour wins (1)
1997 Komatsu Country Cup

Team appearances
Amateur
Australian Men's Interstate Teams Matches (representing Queensland): 1984, 1985

External links

Australian male golfers
Japan Golf Tour golfers
PGA Tour Champions golfers
1963 births
Living people